A parkway is a landscaped thoroughfare (road).

Parkway or Park Way may also refer to:

Transportation

Road
A scenic route, or a road giving access through, or into, a park or an area of wilderness
A controlled-access highway, especially one which is more scenic or particularly suited to light vehicles, or for recreational motoring
A North American regional term for a road verge: the space between a sidewalk and a roadway, often containing grass or trees

Rail
A park and ride railway station

Places

Brazil
Park Way, Federal District

England
Parkway, Herefordshire
Parkway Newbury, a retail and residential development in Newbury, Berkshire

New Zealand
Parkway, New Zealand, a suburb of Wainuiomata, Lower Hutt

United States
Parkway, Boston, a section of Roslindale and West Roxbury, Boston, Massachusetts
Parkway, California, a census-designated place in Sacramento County
Parkway, Missouri, a village

Other places
 Parkway Village (disambiguation)

Other
Parkway (St. John's), a road in St. John's, Newfoundland and Labrador
Parkway Drive, an Australian metalcore band
Parkway High School (disambiguation)
Parkway School District, a school district in St. Louis, Missouri